Ting Hua-tien (born 11 October 2002) is a Taiwanese artistic gymnast who represented her country at the 2018 and 2019 World Championships. Ting competed at the 2020 Olympic Games, making her the first Taiwanese female gymnast to qualify for an Olympic Games since 1968. She is the 2019 Asian Champion on the balance beam.

Early life
Ting was born on 11 October 2002 in Taipei. She first tried gymnastics at a summer camp when she was four years old. Her gymnastics idols are Simone Biles and fellow Taiwanese gymnast Lee Chih-kai.

She has been studying at the Department of Physical Education of the Fu Jen Catholic University since 2021.

Career
In May 2017, Ting competed at the Asian Junior Championships, placing 12th in the all-around and seventh on the balance beam. She also helped the Taiwanese team finish sixth.

Ting turned senior in 2018, making her senior debut at the Gymnasiade in Rabat, Morocco, placing 16th in the all-around. Later that year, she competed at the 2018 World Championships in Doha, Qatar where she placed 66th all-around and 10th on the balance beam during qualifications. She was the second reserve on the balance beam, narrowly missing out on the final.

Ting opened her 2019 season at the Melbourne World Cup where she made the uneven bars and floor exercise finals, finishing seventh and eighth respectively. At the World Cup, Ting submitted an original element, a split leap to ring position with half turn on floor exercise, which was named after her in the Code of Points after she successfully performed it in qualifications. She is the first Taiwanese gymnast to get a skill named after them in the Code. Ting went on to compete at the Baku World Cup, where she did not reach the finals, and the Doha World Cup, where she placed sixth on the balance beam. In June, Ting competed at the Asian Championships where she placed seventh in the all-around, sixth on the uneven bars, seventh on floor exercise, and won the gold medal on beam. At the World Championships, Ting finished 88th all-around in qualifications, earning a berth for the 2020 Summer Olympics and becoming the first Taiwanese female gymnast to qualify for the Olympics since 1968.

In August 2020, Ting competed at the Taiwan Test Event, a multisport event organized for Taiwanese athletes in place of the postponed Tokyo Olympics. She won the gold medal on the balance beam, taking the silver in the all-around, as well as on vault and the uneven bars.

At the 2020 Summer Olympics, Ting competed on the uneven bars and the balance beam during qualifications, placing 63rd and 50th respectively. She did not advance to the finals.

Eponymous skill
Ting has one eponymous skill listed in the Code of Points.

Competitive history

References

External links

2002 births
Living people
Taiwanese female artistic gymnasts
Sportspeople from Taipei
Originators of elements in artistic gymnastics
Gymnasts at the 2020 Summer Olympics
Olympic gymnasts of Taiwan
Fu Jen Catholic University alumni
21st-century Taiwanese women